El Paraíso is one of the 18 departments (departamentos) into which Honduras is divided.

The territory of El Paraíso was initially part of the departments of Tegucigalpa (renamed Francisco Morazán in 1943) and Olancho after Central America gained its independence in 1825. The department of El Paraíso was created with municipalities taken from the departments of Tegucigalpa and Olancho on 28 May 1869 by congressional decree in the third political division of Honduras, during the presidential term of José María Medina. Initially El Paraíso included the jurisdictions of Danlí, Yuscarán and Texiguat, along with the town of Guinope. On December 28, 1878, Texiguat was moved to the department of Tegucigalpa, but subsequently moved back into El Paraíso on October 28, 1886.

The departmental capital is Yuscarán. El Paraíso is bordered to the north by the department of Olancho, to the south by the department of de Choluteca, to the east by the Republic of Nicaragua, and to the west by the department of Francisco Morazán.

El Paraíso department covers a total surface area of 7489 km² and, in 2015, had an estimated population of 458,742.

Municipalities

 Alauca
 Danlí
 El Paraíso
 Guinope
 Jacaleapa
 Liure
 Morocelí
 Oropolí
 Potrerillos
 San Antonio de Flores
 San Lucas
 San Matías
 Soledad
 Teupasenti
 Texiguat
 Trojes
 Vado Ancho
 Yauyupe
 Yuscarán

References

 
Departments of Honduras
States and territories established in 1869